Vault II is a 2003 compilation album by the hard rock band Pretty Boy Floyd.

Track listing

 It's Still Rock N' Roll To Me
 When You Need A Friend
 No Respect For The Law
 Wild Rule The Night
 We've Got Rock N'Roll
 Sweet Lil' Dancer
 Saturday Night In The U.S.A
 Take You For A Ride
 Where Are You?
7 Minutes In Heaven (Live)
Shut Up
Were A Happy Family
Million Miles Away

2003 compilation albums
Pretty Boy Floyd (American band) albums